A state fair is a competitive and recreational gathering in the United States. It may also refer to:

 State Fair (novel), a 1932 novel by Phil Stong
 State Fair (1933 film), based on the novel
 State Fair (1945 film), a musical remake
 State Fair (1962 film), a remake of the musical version
 State Fair (1976 film), a television pilot loosely based upon the novel
 State Fair (musical), a 1996 musical play based upon the Stong novel
 State Fair, a neighborhood in Detroit, Michigan
 State Fair (song), a single by country music singer Doug Supernaw on his 1994 album Deep Thoughts from a Shallow Mind